Gundagardi is a 1997 Indian Hindi-language film directed by V. Sai Prasad and produced by M.C. Bokadia, starring  Vijayashanti, Raj Babbar and Gulshan Grover with Dharmendra in a supporting role. The film was dubbed in Telugu as Gunda Darbar and in Tamil as Thalaivi.

Plot
The two brothers Kalicharan and Narshima cause havoc all over the city. The police call in Karan Singh as the most effective policeman to fight against them. His sister was married to a journalist. He encounters a murder of the minister by Kalicharan and decides to print their photos in the newspaper. But before he can do that he is killed along with his wife. Dipa is an eyewitness to this murder. But he soon plans and makes Dipa the key suspect in an attempt-to-murder case of the home minister. Karan Singh, in the meanwhile, trains Dipa to fight back against the goons. She manages to get the files containing the proof. Kalicharan is arrested and taken to court. Narshima makes a number of attempts to free his brother. A severe struggle ensues and Narshima and Kalicharan get death sentences.

Cast
Dharmendra as Police Commissioner Karan Singh
Aditya Pancholi as Raja
Vijayashanti as Deepa
Ayub Khan as Ajay
Simran as Guddi
Raj Babbar as Kalicharan
Gulshan Grover as Narsimha
Harish (in song Saila Saila)

Songs

References

1990s Hindi-language films
1997 films
Films scored by Jatin–Lalit
Indian action films
1990s masala films
1997 action films